Church magazine was a professional quarterly of pastoral theology and ministry published by the National Pastoral Life Center. It was written especially for pastors, parish leaders, and  members of diocesan offices. Its founding editor was Margaret O’Brien Steinfels, who began editing the magazine in 1986. It won awards from the Catholic Press Association.

External links
National Pastoral Life Center Records

Catholic magazines published in the United States